William Howard Peter Wisher Jr. is an American screenwriter, known for his work with long-time friend James Cameron on The Terminator and Terminator 2: Judgment Day.

Career
Wisher has had roles behind and in front of the camera. In the first Terminator film, Wisher has a brief role as 1L19 (real name unknown), an LAPD police officer who is incapacitated into his own police cruiser by the Terminator, who then steals his vehicle and briefly assumes his identity on the police radio band. He also has a cameo appearance in Terminator 2: Judgment Day; here he plays a man shopping with his girlfriend and takes pictures of Arnold Schwarzenegger's T-800 Terminator getting back on his feet after being thrown through a store window. He also plays news reporter Bill Tyler in Cameron's 1989 film The Abyss.

Wisher's other screenwriting work includes Judge Dredd, The 13th Warrior and both versions of The Exorcist prequel. He is an uncredited script doctor on two films in the Die Hard series, 1995's Die Hard with a Vengeance and 2007's Live Free or Die Hard (on which he also served as executive producer).

Filmography

References

External links
 

20th-century American male writers
20th-century American screenwriters
21st-century American male writers
21st-century American screenwriters
American male screenwriters
Hugo Award-winning writers
Living people
Year of birth missing (living people)